Chilanga is a town in the Northern Province of Zambia. It is near the border with Tanzania.

Transport

Chilanga is served by a station on the TAZARA railway.

Namesakes

There is another town named Chilanga 20 km south of the Zambian Capital, Lusaka. See Chilanga (Lusaka), Zambia.

See also
  Transport in Zambia
  Railway stations in Zambia

References

Populated places in Northern Province, Zambia